Suzano is a train station on CPTM Line 11-Coral, located in the city of Suzano.

History

Old history
The station was by of North Railway and was named Piedade stop, due to its proximity to Mercy Chapel, located in the village of Baruel. In 1879, Antonio Marques Figueira, considered one of the founders of the city, goes to the village and its growth starts, now named Concórdia, and, with that, a new station was necessary.

In the first decade of the 20th century, the wish of a new passenger station was reached after strong movement of local leaderships. The claims for better installations in the train stop were taken to the railway engineer Joaquim Augusto Suzano Brandão, who, after developing a solid study, attended the claims through the inclusion of the wished constructions in his work plan.

In 1894, the village receives a new station renamed as Guayó.

The new station was rebuilt in the same patterns of that time and, as a way to show the recognition for the services provided by Suzano Brandão, the residents accepted to rename the rail station with his name. In December 1907, Guayó station was renamed to Suzano station, a fair tribute to its idealizer.

EFCB operated the station until 1957, when it was incorporated to the Federal Railway Network, which built a new building in 1979. In 1994, the station was transferred to CPTM, along with the lines of the old CBTU.

Recent history
In the beginning of 2011, the construction work for the implantation of a new station started. However, they didn't last too much, as there were problems with estates expropriations, due to factors like indemnity, disturbed the work progress, delaying the delivery date for almost a year. In mid-2012, the temporary station was opened a little bit ahead from the old one, where the demolished houses were. On 27 January 2013, the old building was demolished, so the new one could be built in the same place. Initially, the deliver date of the new building was scheduled for December 2012, then to 2013, 2014, 2015, end of January 2016 and, finally, February 2016.

The new station was opened. after 9 delays, on 12 February 2016. On the same day, 6 more trains from East Express were incorporated to the line, raising in 20% the number of trains. With that, the number of daily direct travels to Guaianases were increased from 24 to 30.

References

Companhia Paulista de Trens Metropolitanos stations
Railway stations opened in 1875
Railway stations opened in 2016